There's Something About a Soldier could refer to: 

"There's Something About a Soldier", a 1933 song by Noel Gay
There's Something About a Soldier (1934 film), an American animated Betty Boop short film
There's Something About a Soldier (1943 film), an American drama film directed by Alfred E. Green
"There's Something About a Soldier", a 1996 episode of the British television series Goodnight Sweetheart